Junction Village is a suburb in Melbourne, Victoria, Australia, 45 km south-east of Melbourne's Central Business District, located within the City of Casey local government area. Junction Village recorded a population of 1,051 at the 2021 census.

Junction Village has a small row of shops and a sports oval.

See also
 City of Cranbourne – Junction Village was previously within this former local government area.

References

Suburbs of Melbourne
Suburbs of the City of Casey